Heyliger is a surname. Notable people with the surname include:

Dillon Heyliger (born 1989), Canadian cricketer
Frederick Heyliger (1916–2001), United States Army officer
George Heyliger (1919–1942), United States Marine
Grisha Heyliger-Marten (born 1976), Sint Maarten politician
Vic Heyliger (1912–2006), American ice hockey player and coach

See also
USS Heyliger (DE-510), a United States Navy John C. Butler-class destroyer escort
Mathijs Heyligers (born 1957), Dutch violin maker